Paulien van Deutekom (4 February 1981 – 2 January 2019) was a Dutch champion speed skater who specialised in the middle to long distances, over 1000 and 1500 metres.

Biography
In November 2005, Van Deutekom surprised when she skated among the best at the Speed Skating World Cup qualification tournament at several distances and as a result qualified for those World Cups. During her first ever World Cup event in the Olympic Oval in Calgary she skated a new Dutch record over 1500 metres, with a time of 1:55.43, overtaking the previous record by Annamarie Thomas. Her record was broken a week later by Ireen Wüst with a time of 1:54.93.

Later, in December 2005 she participated at the 2005 Dutch Single Distance Championships, which was also the Olympic Qualification tournament. At the 1500 metres distance she finished in second position and qualified for the 2006 Winter Olympics. She also had chances over 1000 metres, however only finished in fourth position and did not directly qualify. A skate-off between her and Barbara de Loor settled the contest for the slot in De Loor's favour. She was selected for the pursuit team. At the Olympics Van Deutekom finished 13th over 1500 metres, while the pursuit team was eliminated at an early stage.

In the European Championships Allround in January 2008 she came second after her teammate Ireen Wüst. In February 2008 Van Deutekom won the World Allround Speed Skating Championships in Berlin. In March 2008 Van Deutekom finished second at the World Single Distance Championships in Nagano in the 1500 metres and the 3000 metres. In March 2012 after the 1500 metre event at the World Cup in Heerenveen, Van Deutekom announced that she was ending her skating career.

Post skating career
Following her retirement van Deutekom was a pundit for Dutch broadcaster NOS.
Van Deutekom died on 2 January 2019 after being diagnosed with lung cancer six months earlier at the age of 37. Van Deutekom is survived by her husband Kay van der Kooi and daughter Lynn, born in 2017.

Personal records

Source: SpeedskatingResults.com & speedskatingbase.eu

Tournament overview

 NC = No classification due to not qualifying for the last distance

Source:

References

1981 births
2019 deaths
Dutch female speed skaters
Olympic speed skaters of the Netherlands
Speed skaters at the 2006 Winter Olympics
Sportspeople from Gouda, South Holland
Universiade medalists in speed skating
World Allround Speed Skating Championships medalists
World Single Distances Speed Skating Championships medalists
Deaths from lung cancer
Deaths from cancer in the Netherlands
Universiade silver medalists for the Netherlands
Competitors at the 2005 Winter Universiade
21st-century Dutch women